Information inequality may mean 
in statistics, the Cramér–Rao bound, an inequality for the variance of an estimator based on the information in a sample
in information theory, inequalities in information theory describes various inequalities specific to that context.
in sociology, Information Inequality and Social Barriers
also in sociology, information inequity